Rowshanai (also Romanized as Rowshanā'ī) is a village in Khenejin Rural District, in the Central District of Komijan County, Markazi Province, Iran. At the 2006 census, its population was 287, in 69 families.

References 

Populated places in Komijan County